Seven Bends State Park is a state park in the U.S. state of Virginia, located approximately  from the town of Woodstock, near the historic "Seven Bends" region of the North Fork Shenandoah River. The park, Virginia's 41st, provides recreational and land-based outdoor recreational and educational opportunities for visitors while protecting the natural resources of the river and the surrounding landscape.

History
The park was assembled from several different parcels of land bordering the river. Dr. James R. Myers donated  next to the reservoir. This property had formerly been a camp for young boys known as "Camp Lupton."

Description
The park land is bounded on the eastern side by Powell Mountain in the Massanutten Mountain range and the George Washington and Jefferson National Forests, which provides visitors with additional outdoor recreation opportunities. The park's western boundary is the Shenandoah River. The park lands along the banks of North Fork of the Shenandoah River generally consist of old floodplain terraces.

Entrances 
The park has two entrances that are not interconnected to each other within the park. The Hollingsworth Road Entrance features a boat launch, picnic tables, and restroom facilities. The Bass Bight Trailhead is also accessed from this entrance. The Lupton Road entrance includes a parking area, picnic tables, boat launch, and access to the Gokotta and Eagles Edge Trails. The park has eight miles of hiking and biking trails, including two miles of trail that lie along the Shenandoah River.

Activities

In addition to hiking, activities include fishing and boating. There are no designated swimming areas in the park due to the swift currents.

, there is no visitor center, ranger station, or campground at the park.

References

External links 
 Seven Bends State Park

State parks of Virginia
Parks in Shenandoah County, Virginia
Protected areas established in 2019
2019 establishments in Virginia